The 1953 AAA Championship Car season consisted of 12 races, beginning in Speedway, Indiana on May 30 and concluding in Phoenix, Arizona on November 11.  There was also one non-championship event in Mechanicsburg, Pennsylvania.  The AAA National Champion was Sam Hanks, and the Indianapolis 500 winner was Bill Vukovich. Chet Miller died while practicing for the Indianapolis 500.

Schedule and results

  The Indianapolis 500 was AAA-sanctioned and counted towards the 1953 World Championship of Drivers.
  73 laps were completed.  Race stopped due to flipped car.  Final standings reverted to 51 laps because of red flag and work done on cars.  Half points awarded.
  No pole is awarded for the Pikes Peak Hill Climb, in this schedule on the pole is the driver who started first. No lap led was awarded for the Pikes Peak Hill Climb, however, a lap was awarded to the drivers that completed the climb.

Final points standings

Note1: The points became the car, when not only one driver led the car, the relieved driver became small part of the points. Points for driver method: (the points for the finish place) / (number the lap when completed the car) * (number the lap when completed the driver) 
Note2: Bob Scott was running at the finish of two races after taking over mid-event as a relief driver.

References
 
 
 
 http://media.indycar.com/pdf/2011/IICS_2011_Historical_Record_Book_INT6.pdf  (p. 291-294)

See also
 1953 Indianapolis 500

AAA Championship Car season
AAA Championship Car
1953 in American motorsport
1953 in sports in Arizona